Robert Lawrence Welch Jr. (August 31, 1945 – June 7, 2012) was an American musician who was a member of Fleetwood Mac from 1971 to 1974. He had a successful solo career in the late 1970s. His singles included "Hot Love, Cold World", "Ebony Eyes", "Precious Love", "Hypnotized", and his signature song, "Sentimental Lady".

Early life
Welch was born in Hollywood, California, into a show business family. His father, Robert L. Welch Sr., was a producer and screenwriter at Paramount Pictures, producing films starring Bob Hope and Bing Crosby. Welch Sr. produced the 25th Annual Academy Awards TV special in 1953 and The Thin Man TV series from 1958 to 1959. Bob's mother, Templeton Fox, was a singer and actress who worked with Orson Welles' Mercury Theatre in Chicago and appeared in TV and movies from 1962 to 1979.

Welch learned clarinet in his childhood, switching to guitar in his early teens. His interests were jazz, rhythm and blues, and rock music. He was accepted into Georgetown University, but instead moved to Paris, planning to attend the Sorbonne. Welch told People in a 1979 interview that, in Paris, "I mostly smoked hash with bearded guys five years older" and spent most of his time "sitting in the Deux Magots café". He returned to Southern California, where he briefly studied French at the University of California, Los Angeles but did not complete a degree.

In 1964, Welch joined the Los Angeles-based vocal group The Seven Souls as a guitarist. The Seven Souls lost a battle of the bands competition, the prize being a contract with Epic Records, to Sly and the Family Stone. The Seven Souls' 1967 single "I'm No Stranger" made no impact at the time of its release, despite subsequent issue in France and Italy. Its B-side, "I Still Love You", has since become a Northern Soul anthem, with original copies selling up to £400. The Seven Souls broke up in 1969.

Welch subsequently returned to Paris and started a trio, Head West, which was not a success. He later told People that his time in Paris (1969-1971) was "living on rice and beans and sleeping on the floor."

Fleetwood Mac
In 1971, Welch auditioned for Fleetwood Mac at Benifold, their retreat in England. The band had recently lost one of its front-line members, guitarist Jeremy Spencer, and were looking for a replacement. Judy Wong, a friend and part-time secretary for the band, recommended her high school friend Welch. The band had a few meetings with Welch and decided to hire him, despite not having previously played with him, after listening to some of his songs on tape. Welch was assigned rhythm guitar, backing up lead guitarist Danny Kirwan. Welch also lived in the band's communal home, 'Benifold', located in Hampshire.

Using mobile equipment hired from The Rolling Stones, the band recorded material for three albums at Benifold: Bare Trees, Penguin and Mystery to Me. The band's first album to feature Christine McVie and Welch, Future Games, was recorded at Advision Studios in London (as is cited on the back of the album jacket). The next album, Bare Trees, was mostly recorded at De Lane Lea Studios in Wembley, London.

In September 1971 the band released Future Games, with the title song written by Welch. This album was different from anything the band had done previously. In 1972, six months after the release of Future Games, the band released Bare Trees, which featured Welch's "Sentimental Lady". This song was a big hit for Welch five years later when he re-recorded it for his solo album French Kiss. Christine McVie also sang on the remake, and was a producer of the song.

Friction: Danny Kirwan
The band was comfortable playing in the studio, but tours started to be problematic. Kirwan developed an alcohol dependency, and by 1972 was becoming alienated from Welch and the rest of the band. Welch had enormous respect for Kirwan's talents as a guitarist, singer and songwriter — he later described Kirwan as "a brilliant musician" — and in the sixteen months he and Kirwan were together in Fleetwood Mac, they had a productive musical partnership. But Mick Fleetwood recalled, "They were very different as people and as musicians". On a personal level there was friction between them, and Welch, an outgoing Californian, found Kirwan to be withdrawn, insecure and difficult to communicate with. He also suspected that Kirwan did not appreciate his musical style. "I think Danny thought I was too clever a player ... too jazzy, too many weird notes. I don't feel he loved my stuff to death."

In 1999 Welch said Kirwan had been "a talented, gifted musician, almost equal to Pete Green in his beautiful guitar playing and faultless string bends," but commented in a later interview: "Danny wasn't a very lighthearted person, to say the least. He probably shouldn't have been drinking as much as he did, even at his young age. He was always very intense about his work, as I was, but he didn't seem to ever be able to distance himself from it and laugh about it."

Before a concert on a US tour in August 1972, a backstage argument between a drunken Kirwan and Welch resulted in Kirwan smashing his guitar, trashing the dressing room and refusing to go on stage. Having reportedly smashed his head bloody on a wall, Kirwan watched the band struggle through the set without him, with Welch trying to cover his guitar parts. Welch remembered, "I was extremely pissed off, and the set seemed to drag on forever." The band fired Kirwan, and the artistic direction of Fleetwood Mac was left in the hands of Welch and Christine McVie. Fleetwood said later that the pressure had become too much for Kirwan, and he had suffered a breakdown.

Challenges
Over the next three albums Fleetwood Mac released, they constantly changed line-ups around the core of Mick Fleetwood, the McVies and Welch. Kirwan was replaced by Savoy Brown lead singer Dave Walker and Bob Weston on lead guitar. Both Walker and Weston played on Penguin. Released in January 1973, the album reached No. 49 on the Billboard Top 200 album chart in the United States. This album contained songs "Bright Fire" and "Revelations" by Welch.

Mystery to Me contained Welch's song "Hypnotized", which earned significant FM radio airplay in the United States. However, as a result of an aborted tour, Mystery to Me only reached No. 67 in the States.

'Fake Mac' and Relocation to LA

By late 1973, internal stresses caused by line-up changes, touring, the deterioration of the McVies' marriage (exacerbated by John's alcoholism), and an affair between Weston and Fleetwood's wife, Jenny Boyd, were debilitating to the band. Weston was sacked and the band quit a tour of the US.

The band's manager, Clifford Davis, and Fleetwood had an argument over that tour, because of the trouble the band had with Weston they were in no shape to continue the tour. And Davis remarking "We are going to play that tour even if I have to assemble a band myself and have them perform as 'Fleetwood Mac'" at which Fleetwood agreed "That is not a bad idea." And so the both of them assembled a new band and had them rehearse for the tour.

During this limbo, Welch stayed in Los Angeles and connected with entertainment attorneys. Welch believed the band was being neglected by Warner Bros.—the parent of their label, Reprise Records—and convinced the band to move to Los Angeles. Rock promoter Bill Graham wrote a letter to Warner Bros. to convince them that the "real" Fleetwood Mac were in fact Fleetwood, Welch and the McVies. While this did not end the legal battle, the band was able to record as Fleetwood Mac again.

Instead of getting another manager, Fleetwood Mac decided to manage themselves. After the courts ruled that the "Fleetwood Mac" name belonged to Fleetwood and John McVie, the two band members set up their own band management company, Seedy Management.

It took until the early 2000s before Fleetwood was summoned to court, and Davis and Gantry's names were cleared of all blame.

Heroes Are Hard to Find and Departure from Fleetwood Mac
In 1974, Welch was the only guitar player in the band. Warner Bros. made a new deal with Fleetwood Mac, releasing the album Heroes Are Hard to Find on Reprise in September 1974. The album became the band's first to reach the Top 40 in the United States, peaking at No. 34 on the Billboard chart. The subsequent tour would be Welch's last with Fleetwood Mac.

Welch was suffering with personal and professional issues: his marriage was failing, and he felt he had exhausted his creativity with the band. Later, he explained that he felt estranged from John and Christine McVie, yet close to Fleetwood, with whom, he asserted, he was running the band in 1974. Welch resigned from Fleetwood Mac in December 1974 and was replaced by Lindsey Buckingham and Stevie Nicks.

Of the Fleetwood Mac albums on which Welch appeared, American album sales totaled 500,000 units shipped between 1971 and 2000 for Future Games; 1 million units of Bare Trees between 1972 and 1988; and 500,000 units of Mystery to Me between 1973 and 1976, when it was certified gold by the Recording Industry Association of America.

Welch's relationship with his former band remained amicable in the years following his departure. During the height of their respective popularity in the late 1970s, Welch would frequently open for Fleetwood Mac and he would sit in as lead vocalist on "Hypnotized". Mick Fleetwood managed Welch's career into the 1980s.

Lawsuit

The Buckingham–Nicks version of Fleetwood Mac achieved superstar status with the albums Fleetwood Mac (1975) and Rumours (1977), both reaching No. 1 in the US. Rumours shipped 40 million units worldwide and remains one of the most successful albums ever released.

By the 1990s, Welch's once diplomatic relationship with Fleetwood Mac had become acrimonious. In 1994, Welch sued Fleetwood, the McVies, band attorney Michael Shapiro and Warner Bros. Records for breach of contract related to underpayment of royalties. Previously, in 1978, Welch and the band had signed a contract with Warner Bros. agreeing to an equal share of all royalties from their Fleetwood Mac albums. Welch alleged that the members later made new deals with Warner Bros. for higher royalty rates, and neither Fleetwood nor the McVies had informed Welch, thus cheating him out of equal royalties. The lawsuit was settled in 1996.

Hall of Fame controversy and reconciliation
When Fleetwood Mac was inducted into the Rock and Roll Hall of Fame in 1998, original band members Peter Green, Jeremy Spencer, Danny Kirwan, Mick Fleetwood, and John McVie were named to the Hall, as were Christine McVie, Lindsey Buckingham, and Stevie Nicks. Welch, who anchored the band for several years and five albums, was not. Welch felt the recent legal battle with the band soured the committee to include him. "My era was the bridge era," Welch told the Cleveland newspaper the Plain Dealer in 1998. "It was a transition. But it was an important period in the history of the band. Mick Fleetwood dedicated a whole chapter of his biography to my era of the band and credited me with 'saving Fleetwood Mac'. Now they want to write me out of the history of the group. It hurts... Mick and I co-managed the group for years. I'm the one who brought the band to Los Angeles from England, which put them in the position of hooking up with Lindsey and Stevie. I saw the band through a whole period where they barely survived, literally."

In a 2003 online question-and-answer session on the Fleetwood Mac fan site The Penguin, Welch revised his opinion about the exclusion. He had recently visited Fleetwood Mac backstage after a show, and he reconnected with Mick Fleetwood. Welch no longer blamed the band for his exclusion. He instead blamed the Hall's committee and its industry insiders (such as Ahmet Ertegun and Jann Wenner), stating they did not like his style of music. He still maintained that the lawsuit was a factor, as it prevented him from contacting Mick Fleetwood, and they were still estranged at the time of the induction.

Rock trio and solo career
In 1975, Welch formed the short-lived hard rock power trio Paris with ex-Jethro Tull bassist Glenn Cornick and former Nazz drummer Thom Mooney. Paris released two commercially unsuccessful albums: Paris and Big Towne, 2061. Hunt Sales later replaced Mooney until the group disbanded.

In a 1979 interview with People, Welch said that the two Paris albums were "ill-conceived." The band's lack of success drained Welch's finances, until he had only $8,000 left.

In September 1977, Welch released his first solo album, French Kiss, a mainstream pop collection featuring contributions from Fleetwood, Buckingham and Christine McVie. The album was certified platinum by the RIAA, peaking at No. 12 on the Billboard chart in 1978. It yielded three hit singles: a revamped version of "Sentimental Lady" produced by Buckingham and McVie (#8), "Ebony Eyes" (#14; featuring Juice Newton on backing vocals) and "Hot Love, Cold World" (#31).

Welch followed up French Kiss with two albums in 1979.  In February, Three Hearts, an album that replicated the rock/disco fusion of French Kiss, peaked at No. 20 (earning a RIAA gold certification) and spawned the hit "Precious Love" (#19), while the follow-up single "Church" (#73) also charted. His second effort that year, November's "The Other One", saw Bob's first solo recordings without the help of any Fleetwood Mac members. This album reached No. 105 on the charts, though no singles on this record charted. Notable songs include "Rebel Rouser" and "Don't Let Me Fall". From 1980 to 1981, he hosted Hollywood Heartbeat, an early music video program. His subsequent solo albums into the early 1980s (Man Overboard, Bob Welch, and Eye Contact) were not successful and his career declined.

In 1999, Welch released an experimental jazz/loop-based album, Bob Welch Looks at Bop. He followed this up in 2003 with His Fleetwood Mac Years and Beyond, which contained new recordings of songs he originally recorded with Fleetwood Mac, as well as some solo hits. In 2006, he released His Fleetwood Mac Years and Beyond 2, which mixed a half-dozen new compositions, along with a similar number of his Mac/solo remakes. He released more CDs with Fuel Records in 2008, 2010, and 2011.

Welch appeared as an avatar named BobWelch Magic in 2008, performing solo acoustic favorites and hits live for 30 minutes, in a show with Von Johin (musician/publisher Mike Lawson) and Cypress Rosewood (musician Tony Gerber) in the virtual world of Second Life, streaming live into the Gibson Island virtual stage from Lawson's studio.

Recovery and second marriage 
During the mid-1980s (following the release of Eye Contact), Welch took to partying with Guns N' Roses, who were rehearsing in his garage. He became addicted to cocaine and heroin, and was hospitalized for detox in spring of 1985. Welch reflected on that era as "being a very bad boy, very decadent, very cynical, VERY stoned. It was not a good time."

The day he was released from detox, he was introduced to Wendy Armistead by Taryn Power (Tyrone Power's daughter) and Tony Sales at The Central (now The Viper Room). Welch and Armistead were married in December 1985 and moved to Phoenix, Arizona, to maintain Welch's sobriety. Welch abstained from all illegal drugs for the rest of his life.

While in Phoenix, they formed a short-lived group called Avenue M. The group went on tour and recorded one song for a greatest hits compilation. They later moved to Nashville, Tennessee, and remained married until his death.

Death and legacy
Welch had undergone spinal surgery three months prior to his death. Despite the surgery, doctors told him his prognosis for recovery was poor, and he would eventually become an invalid. He was still in considerable pain, despite taking the medication pregabalin (Lyrica) for six weeks.

On June 7, 2012, around 6:00 a.m., Welch died by suicide, shooting himself in his Nashville home where his wife Wendy discovered his body. He left a nine-page suicide note and love letter for Wendy. He was 66 years old.

Wendy died on November 28, 2016, from chronic obstructive pulmonary disease (COPD) and heart disease, also aged 66.

Bob and Wendy Welch are buried beside each other in Memphis, Tennessee.

An exhibit chronicling Bob Welch's career opened at The Musicians Hall of Fame at Belmont University in Nashville, Tennessee on August 27, 2018. Despite the lawsuit over a decade earlier, Fleetwood wrote a tribute for the exhibit. Bob and Wendy Welch's estate has endowed a scholarship to support Belmont School of Music students.

Pop Culture 
Bob Welch is mentioned throughout episode one of season eighteen of Family Guy called "Yacht Rocky." The main character, Peter Griffin, finds out that Bob Welch has passed away and takes a moment to lie down and stare at the ceiling while listening to "Sentimental Lady." This repeats several times in the episode as different characters lament about Bob's passing.

Discography

Albums

Solo singles

References

External links
 Bob Welch's MySpace

1945 births
2012 deaths
2012 suicides
American expatriates in France
American expatriates in the United Kingdom
American rock guitarists
Fleetwood Mac members
Suicides by firearm in Tennessee
Lead guitarists
Rhythm guitarists
American male singer-songwriters
American rock songwriters
American rock singers
American soul guitarists
American male guitarists
Guitarists from Los Angeles
20th-century American guitarists
Capitol Records artists
Singer-songwriters from California